Panulirus inflatus, the blue spiny lobster, is a species of crustacean in the family Palinuridae (spiny lobsters). It is commonly caught in artisanal fisheries, but the species is not threatened, being categorized as least concern by the IUCN. There are no subspecies.

References

External links
 

Achelata
Crustaceans described in 1895